Deeside College (Welsh: Coleg Glannau Dyfrdwy) (now part of Coleg Cambria) is located in Connah's Quay, Flintshire, North Wales. It was formerly a further education college in August 2013 to create the college for North East Wales, one of the largest colleges in the United Kingdom.

Coleg Cambria consists of six campuses including Deeside, Yale Grove Park, Yale Bersham Road, Llysfasi, Northop and Wrexham Training.  The encompassed college offers a wide range of courses from Further Education to HNC's and Foundation Degrees for full and part-time students, apprentices and part-time community learners.

Fundraising 

 Staff and students raised £75,746.84 for the Cancer Research UK, the college's nominated charity for 2011–2012
 Staff and students raised £51,062.82 for the RNLI, the college's nominated charity for 2010–2011
 Staff and students raised over £32,000 for the NSPCC, the college's nominated charity for 2009–2010
 Staff and students raised over £32,000 for Marie Curie Cancer Care, the college's nominated charity for 2006–2007
  Staff and students raised over £32,000 for the Alzheimer's Society, the college's nominated charity for 2007–2008

Environment & sustainability 

  Deeside College was the first college in Wales to receive Fairtrade University status
  The college has the Welsh Assembly Government's top Green Dragon level 5 status for sustainable development
  Students study sustainable development during Welsh Baccalaureate and personal tutorial programmes
  The college uses recycled paper for all printed and inhouse publicity materials
   Automatic lighting and solar power have been introduced to reduce energy consumption

Principals 

 In 1952, Fred Roberts was appointed as 'Acting Principal'.
  In 1954, Dr Charles G Lyons, aged 47 took up his post as the first Principal of Flintshire Technical College, with the grand salary of £1,250. He retired in 1970.
 Dr Stan McLintock took over as Principal in 1970, having been in the college since 1954 as Head of Chemistry and Metallurgy.
  In 1975, Professor Dr G O Phillips became the new Executive Principal of the North East Wales Institute.
 Professor Dr G O Phillips stayed as Executive Principal of North East Wales Institute until 1992 and his successor Professor John Williams came in to oversee the development of higher education based in Wrexham.
  Dr Tony Walker was the first Principal of Deeside College in 1993 and he retired late 1996.
  In 1997, Wil Edmunds became Principal and in 2002 and was awarded the OBE by Her Majesty Queen Elizabeth II.
  David B Jones, Deeside College's Principal and Chief Executive, took up his position on 1 September 2004 and became Coleg Cambria's Principal and Chief Executive in August 2013 when Deeside College merged with Yale College in Wrexham.

History 

1952
Flintshire Technical College opens its doors to students
From 1952 to 1956, the college buildings gradually covered almost . In 1959, the college could cater for some 1,000 full-time students and 7,000 part-time students. However, the first official Department of Education and Science return, made by the first Principal, Dr Lyons, at the time (following Acting Principal Fred Roberts), was made on a postcard to the DES and it was noted there were 357 girls and 459 boys in attendance and 27 staff.In 1956, Sir Miles Thomas opened the college and in his official capacity as Chairman of BOAC, cemented the links that the college would have with the Aviation/Aerospace industry for the next 50 years. Now in 2006 Deeside College supports the Airbus UK apprenticeship scheme.

1966 - 1974
Flintshire College of Technology
In the middle of the sixties the institution, now called Flintshire College of Technology, wanted to become a college of advanced technology and also had aspirations for North East Wales to have a university.

At this time the Robbins report on the expansion of Higher Education in the middle sixties was released. This included the 'University of the Air' proposal and the vision of the then Prime Minister Harold Wilson, to begin the development of one of the largest universities of the air, now called the Open University. Flintshire College of Technology played its part in this expansion, offering HNDs and GRAD RICs in chemistry, and more advanced qualifications for the manufacturing industries of North East Wales.

The college was placed as a crucial education and training provider in the development of the North Wales economy and for a further 7 years became the well regarded college of “Advanced Technology”. Student numbers grew and came in from as far as Birkenhead, Preston, Anglesey, Aberystwyth and Hereford. Facilities expanded, residential blocks were built and people were trained on an increasing scale with both public and private finance.

1974 - 1993
Kelsterton College - North East Wales Institute (NEWI)
Textiles, steel making, steel coating, aeroplane construction and companies like Hawker Siddeley, John Summers, Courtaulds International were household names for Flintshire. Thousands upon thousands of iron and steel operatives crossed the Dee to be trained at the college; metallurgy research grew to satisfy the steel expansion and local government was ready for change.

A new county was formed on local government reorganisation in 1974. The new county of Clwyd replaced Wrexham, Denbighshire and Flintshire and was a further manifestation of a new sub-region being created. Part of the changes resulted in a rename from Flintshire College to Kelsterton College of Technology. Very soon the name changed once again to the North East Wales Institute of Higher Education, embracing Wrexham Technical College, Cartrefle Teacher Training College, Wrexham College of Art and the Flintshire College.

1956, 1966 and 1974 are both the chronological landmarks and moreover, the definitive stages of the development of education and training in the region. Paralleled with this, was the mass expansion of Higher Education, Further Education and comprehensive schools. This was a vision cherished by Dr Haydn Williams. Here was in Flintshire, and in Wrexham, the achievement and manifestation of his dreams.

From 1974, the North East Wales Institute expanded under the vision of another prominent educator, Professor Glyn O Phillips, who took the institution forward and made it into a significant research based and practice based technological organisation which had a financial turnover equalling a great many universities close by, like Liverpool, Manchester and Bangor.

1993 - 1996
Deeside College
Twenty years later came the next major upheaval and change to local government organisation. The 7 counties of Wales, including Clwyd, were disbanded to create 22 unitary authorities and Flintshire was reborn, but not as an exact twin of the old ‘Flintshire’.

This change was a little different, for the new Flintshire was not a reincarnation of the pre 1974 reorganisation, as this time it did not embrace Rhyl or the Northern part of Denbighshire, which it did in the middle sixties and early seventies.

A consequence of this local government reorganisation was the determination to concentrate all Higher Education in Wrexham. This resulted in the disaggregation and consequent formation of Deeside College in 1993 which was enshrined in the legislation of 1992 – the Further and Higher Education Act. The College became a separate independent institution with its own board of governors and having corporation status. A new Principal was appointed, Dr Tony Walker, who served for 3 years until early 1997. The name Deeside College was chosen not just because it was geographically in an identifiable and supported industrial zone called Deeside, but also it was a deliberate departure from the names of the past and presented a greater vision for the sub-region of North East Wales.

During the time 1974 to 1993, Flintshire experienced the almost total collapse of steel making, as a consequence in part of a growing worldwide steel making market on the Pacific Rim and in Eastern Europe. Flintshire also experienced the collapse of its textile industries and the transformation of its aerospace manufacturing; Courtaulds Textiles had gone, Hawker Siddeley came and went and British Aerospace was born and matured into what is now Airbus UK. This raised questions as to the purpose of Deeside College from 1993; what was its mission and how would it handle its new found status of independence.

1996 - 2003
Deeside College
Wil Edmunds joined Deeside College as Principal/Chief Executive in 1997 during a time of great upheaval following major changes to the funding systems implemented by the Further Education Funding Council for Wales, and an introduction of more change for further education. Deeside College was required to make significant and sometimes drastic efficiency improvements and maximise income through increased numbers of students. Considerable investments were made to the students’ learning facilities, new stringent financial systems were put into place and a personnel and a finance department was set up. New outreach centres were opened across the county of Flintshire and Deeside College developed partnerships with local primary and secondary schools, libraries and community centres, in order to offer courses at local community venues. Student numbers rapidly increased by over 50%.

The college reinvested that income on a large scale into the transformation of its buildings and in the building of new enterprises for the community.

The first new enterprise was the building of The Deeside College Sports Stadium which was officially opened on 6 October 1998 by the Rt. Hon. Ron Davies MP, Secretary of State for Wales at that time, and the architect of the National Assembly for Wales. With a full size football pitch and an international running track, the stadium soon became home to the Connah's Quay Nomads Football team and the Deeside Athletics Association, who continue to use the facilities.

In 1999, the recently established Mold Learning Centre was moved from St David's Building, St David's Square in Mold to Terrig House, Chester Street in Mold, which was originally the old police station building. Next to the bus station, this proved to be a popular location and the centre has quickly developed into a thriving community learning venue.

From 2000 to 2002, new learning centres were created in local companies like Airbus UK, Corus Colors, Castle Cement and Merloni Electrodomestici; (formerly Hotpoint/GDA), as part of a series of partnership arrangements which helped employees at all levels access learning, including those working on shift patterns. Deeside College was instrumental in improving the skills of the local workforce through these initiatives and through what is now the largest and most comprehensive work-based training programme in the whole of Wales.

In August 2001, the college's Netcafe opened its doors in Shotton and offered drop-in computer facilities with a café, learndirect centre and classroom areas for short courses.

On 4 June 2003, the Deeside College Centre of Engineering Excellence was officially opened by Her Majesty Queen Elizabeth II. This £8 million pound centre was fully fitted out with the latest high technology equipment for the motor vehicle, aero-engineering, electrical/electronic, fabrication and welding and gas installation fields. Specialist electronic, optronic and avionic equipment was installed within these new workshops.

2003 - 2009
Deeside College
With extensive partnership links across Wales, the UK and internationally, Deeside College became a world-class provider of education, training and development and consultancy

Deeside College drew considerable strength from its ability to provide modern and flexible learning environments. The college worked in partnership with local and national employers, with private training providers, secondary schools and the voluntary sector, to ensure that learning provision met the needs of the local community and businesses across Wales and Britain.

In 2003, Deeside College had 30,000 enrolments based around its main campus in Connah's Quay, its Mold Learning Centre, the Netcafe in Shotton and over 20 learning centres across the local communities of Flintshire.

International consultancy and development work continued and Deeside College maintained strong links with other educational institutions and business networks including South Africa, United States, Germany and Finland.

2009 - 2010
Deeside College
Following Welsh Assembly Government approval, on 1 August 2009 Deeside College and the nearby Welsh College of Horticulture merged. The new institution, which is one of the largest in Wales and the UK, provides courses for almost 20,000 students each year, employs over 800 staff, and has an annual income approaching £30million.

2010–2013
Deeside College
Following Welsh Assembly Government approval Deeside College and Coleg Llysfasi in Ruthin merged on 1 August 2010. The new institution which was one of the largest in Wales and the UK, provided courses for almost 22,000 students each year, employing over 1000 staff, and with an annual income approaching £40million.

The Deeside College Group encompassed three colleges: Deeside College, Northop College and Coleg Llysfasi, together with the Wrexham Training site at Felin Puleston near Rhostyllen, Wrexham, which was part of Coleg Llysfasi prior to the latter's merger with Deeside College.

Deeside College also had a learning facility with internet access and café at the Futures@Holywell centre, and over 20 learning centres across the local communities of Flintshire, Denbighshire and Wrexham.

2013–present
Coleg Cambria
Following Welsh Assembly Government approval Coleg Cambria was formed following the merger of Deeside College and Yale College in August 2013 to create the college for North East Wales, one of the largest UK colleges.

The Fairey Gannet 
The aeroplane, which up until 2003 was sited outside the front what was then known as Deeside College, was a Mark 6 Fairey Gannet. During trials in June 1950 on HMS Illustrious, this had become the first turbo-prop aeroplane to land on an aircraft carrier. The Fairey Gannet went into production in 1953 and into operation in 1955 (Lee-on-Solent, HMS Eagle and HMS Ark Royal). In 1970, Flintshire College of Technology already had four aircraft and bought the surplus Gannet from the Ministry of Defence for £750, to add to its collection.

The aircraft was flown from RAF Lossiemouth into Hawarden Airport in 1971 and was then towed to the college using an agricultural tractor! Even with the wings folded they had some difficulty getting it under the bridge at Shotton. Nevertheless, it reached Connah's Quay safely and was fully utilised by the Aeronautical Engineering Department for training purposes until 1995, when it was put out to grass to stand on guard at the entrance to the College.

In the summer of 2003, the Fairey Gannet was dismantled by 750 Thorne Squadron, Air Training Corps and taken off to South Yorkshire Air Museum. The college donated the aircraft to the Air Museum for tender loving care and restoration by young air cadets.

References

External links
 Coleg Cambria

Further education colleges in Denbighshire
Further education colleges in Flintshire